The No Pants Day is an annual event in various countries. It is held on the first Friday in May.  It requires publicly wearing just undergarments on the lower part of the body.

History 
A small campus club at University of Texas at Austin known as the Knighthood of Buh thought that dropping trousers on the first Friday of May was a humorous stunt for the end of the semester. Informal for years, promotion efforts began in 2000. The event attracted attention in other states and several parts of Canada as well as France, Sweden, Australia, Finland, and Britain.

2021 celebration by comic strips
More than 25 comic strips observed No Pants Day on May 7, 2021, to encourage readers to donate to charities such as Dress for Success and Room to Grow, which provide clothes to those who need them.

See also
No Pants Subway Ride
Underwear as outerwear
Undie Run
World Naked Bike Ride

References

External links
 
 
 No Pants Subway Ride 2018

Community organizing
Unofficial observances
Activities in underwear